Birch Creek is a  tributary of the Yukon River in the U.S. state of Alaska. Beginning at the confluence of Ptarmigan and Eagle creeks near Porcupine Dome, it flows southwest, then south under the Steese Highway and into the Steese National Conservation Area. It then turns east, then north, again passing under the Steese Highway and entering the Yukon Flats National Wildlife Refuge. Turning northwest, it ends where it splits into two distributaries, Lower Mouth Birch Creek and Upper Mouth Birch Creek, near Birch Creek, Alaska. The distributaries flow into the Yukon River at separate locations downstream of Fort Yukon.

History
The first human inhabitants of the region were probably Gwich'in people who hunted and fished along the creek. Gold was found along the creek in 1893. Circle City sprang up as the Alaska Interior's first gold town, governed democratically by traditional miners' meetings. Old mining and trapping cabins are part of the Birch Creek landscape, and mining continues in the 21st century.

Distributaries

Recreation
The Bureau of Land Management (BLM) oversees  of Birch Creek declared "wild" in 1980 as part of the National Wild and Scenic Rivers System. People floating the stream in canoes, kayaks, or rafts can put in at a BLM wayside and take out at another BLM wayside  further downstream. Both are along the Steese Highway. Between these two points, the creek is rated mostly Class I on the International Scale of River Difficulty, but some segments are rated Class II (medium) or III (difficult).

Sports fishing for northern pike and Arctic grayling along Birch Creek can be "outstanding", according to Alaska Fishing. The larger pike frequent the lower reaches of the creek as well as sloughs, ponds, and oxbow lakes in the Yukon Flats. Grayling prefer the headwaters.

The stream corridor has no developed camping sites. Gravel bars in the creek are sometimes used for camping.

In February, the creek serves as a part of the trail for the Yukon Quest  sled dog race. Other winter activities along the stream include dog mushing, trapping, and cross-country skiing.

See also
 List of rivers of Alaska

References

External links
 Birch Creek Wild and Scenic River - BLM page

Rivers of Yukon–Koyukuk Census Area, Alaska
Rivers of Alaska
Wild and Scenic Rivers of the United States
Tributaries of the Yukon River
Rivers of Unorganized Borough, Alaska